Perry Rose is a Belgian-Irish singer, born in Brussels on May 9, 1962, and who has been active in Belgium, France, Switzerland and Ireland since the release of  Because of You in 1991. Rose, who comes from circus families on both his mother and father's side, has since recorded eight albums and toured extensively.

At the end of 2001 Perry recorded Hocus Pocus in Belgium, Brittany and Ireland with Irish producers Graham Murphy and Chris O'Brien from The Production Suite in Dublin (whose credits include Dove, Clannad, Donna Lewis, The Human League, Trevor Horn, Aslan, Perry Blake, Máire Brennan, Picturehouse, Ronan Hardiman and Lord of the Dance). It came out mid April 2002 in France, Switzerland and Belgium, on France's L'Oz Production label.

Guests on the album include French pianist Didier Squiban and Uileann piper Ronan le Bars (known for his work with l’Héritage des Celtes and Dan Ar Braz). It was followed by the live album Happy live recorded at the venerable Brussels venue l’Ancienne Belgique.

Rose has also recorded "Fly" for Didier Laloy / S-TRES, "Stop the pain" for Amnesty International, several traditional Irish tunes in the company of Trio Trad for their compilation Le Monde est un village and a reworked version of "Glasgow" for the CD Eveil aux langues (2005).

Discography 
 1991: Because of You E.P. – Team For Action
 1992: All Seasons
 1996: The Bright Ring of the Day – Team for Action
 1996: Green Bus
 1998: The Triumphant March
 1999: Celtic Circus
 2002: Hocus Pocus
 2004: Happy Live (recorded live at the Ancienne Belgique in Brussels)- Team for Action
 2012: Wonderful – Team for Action

External links 
 Official Perry Rose site in English and French

Belgian people of Irish descent
Musicians from Brussels
Living people
1962 births